The Long Breakup is a long term documentary film directed by Katya Soldak which premiered at the 2020 East Oregon Film Festival.
The documentary was broadcast in a German version titled  on the television channel Arte at the end of March 2022.

Synopsis
Ukrainian journalist Katya Soldak, currently living in New York City and working for Forbes magazine, chronicles Ukraine's history.

The film explores the complex relationship between Ukraine and Russia, particularly in the aftermath of end of Soviet Union. It features interviews with ordinary citizens (foremost the filmmakres family and friends), politicians and experts. They all providie insight into their perspectives and experiences.

Through personal stories and analysis of historical and political factors, "The Long Breakup" sheds light on the tensions and challenges facing Ukraine and its people. Overall, the film presents a nuanced and thought-provoking exploration of a complex and ongoing crisis with its Russian–Ukrainian wars.

Reception 
John Rash, an editorial writer and columnist for StarTribune, writes that the film “gives context to conflict in Ukraine” and that it “shows how Ukraine’s history has been shaped by its relationship with Russia”.

The European public service channel Arte writes, the journalist Katya Soldak tells of the attempts of her home country, Ukraine, to emancipate itself from its overpowering neighbor Russia.

Accolades
According to the film-website from Ante Media:
 Best Of Fest, 41 Minneapolis–Saint Paul International Film Festival, 2022
 Winner, Docs Without Borders Film Festival, 2020
 Official Selection, NewFilmmakers NY, 2021

References

External links

 interview with the filmmaker Soldak (Secession Space: Ukraine’s Path to Independence)

2020 films
2020 documentary films
American documentary films
Documentary films about Ukraine
Euromaidan
Russo-Ukrainian War films